Ger O'Keeffe (born 1952 in Tralee, County Kerry) is an Irish former Gaelic footballer who played for Austin Stack's and at senior level for the Kerry county team between 1973 and 1982.

He is currently a selector with the Kerry senior football team.

Playing career

Schools
O'Keeffe was part of the St Brendan's College, Killarney side that won the Munster Colleges Corn Uí Mhuirí and Hogan Cup in 1969.

Underage
In 1970 O'Keeffe was part of the Kerry minor team that won the Munster Minor Football Championship after beating Cork in the final. Kerry later qualified for the All-Ireland Minor Football Championship, where they lost out to Galway after a replay.

Senior
O'Keeffe was Kerry captain in 1977 when Kerry lost to Dublin.

He was a member of the Kerry four-in-a-row All-Ireland SFC team from 1978 to 1981.

Selector
O'Keeffe was a selector of the senior Kerry team from 2004 to 2006 and again from 2009 until the present. He was also a selector with Jack O'Connor for the Kerry U21 team in 2002 and 2008. He won an All-Ireland Under 21 medal in 1973 and won an All-Ireland Club SFC title with Austin Stacks in 1977.

References

 

1952 births
Living people
All Stars Awards winners (football)
Austin Stacks Gaelic footballers
Austin Stacks hurlers
Dual players
Gaelic football backs
Gaelic football selectors
Kerry inter-county Gaelic footballers
Munster inter-provincial Gaelic footballers
Winners of three All-Ireland medals (Gaelic football)